The Shield of the State of Guanajuato, which originally belonged to the city of the same name, was created by King Carlos I of Spain. The composition of the Shield is as follows: It rests on a mantel depicting being of colored marble trimmed with gold. At the base there is a shell supported by two laurel branches that they are joined by a blue ribbon. The shell that links the shield symbolizes the stability of the home, widening its borders. The background with a field of gold means nobility, magnanimity and purity of feelings, and at the same time, the richness of metals precious that are in the entity. The auction is a symbol of greatness. The laurels are the symbol of victory and the acanthus of the Fidelity; in the center it bears the image of the Santa Fe de la Granada, which symbolizes the triumph of the Catholic monarchs over the Muslims.

References 

Coat of arms
Guanajuato
Guanajuato